Thomas Hopfer (born 20 April 1990) is an Austrian professional footballer.

References

1990 births
Living people
Austrian footballers
Association football midfielders
Austrian Regionalliga players
Grazer AK players
FC Admira Wacker Mödling players
TSV Hartberg players
SV Grödig players
SV Allerheiligen players
SC Weiz players